The Goulsse alphabet was created for writing Gur languages of West Africa, such as Mossi and Kasem. It was developed in 2022 by two people, Wenitte Apiou and Babaguioue Micareme Akouabou of Burkina Faso. The alphabet is said to contain 30 letters, plus punctuation marks, and dots above some vowel symbols to mark nasalization.

The script is written from left to right on a straight line. It does not distinguish between upper and lower case letters. Also, it does not mark tone distinctions. Also, despite the fact that Gur languages have tonal distinctions, the script does not provide a way to mark tone differences.

The name Goulsse means 'writing' in Mossi, spoken in Burkina Faso. It is one of several scripts that have been created in West Africa to contribute to ethnic and linguistic revitalization.
The script has been taught in Po, Burkina Faso.

References

Writing systems of Africa
Alphabets